Cinq études de bruits (Five Studies of Noises) is a collection of musical compositions by Pierre Schaeffer. The five études were composed in 1948 and are the earliest pieces of musique concrète, a form of electroacoustic music that utilises recorded sounds as a compositional resource.

The five études were composed at the studio Schaeffer established at RTF (now ORTF), Studio d'Essai. They are:
 Étude aux chemins de fer - trains
 Étude aux tourniquets - toy tops and percussion instruments
 Étude violette - piano sounds recorded for Schaeffer by Boulez
 Étude noire - piano sounds recorded for Schaeffer by Boulez
 Étude pathétique - sauce pans, canal boats, singing, speech, harmonica, piano

The works were premiered via a broadcast on 5 October 1948, titled Concert de bruits.

In 2011, The New York Times included Étude aux chemins de fer (Railroady Study) in their history of the mashup, describing it as "[t]he first piece of musique concrète, composed from recordings of trains." Academic writer Margaret Schadel, who writes that Schaeffer is widely regarded as the first composer to "create music with pre-recorded media", describes Etude aux Chemins de Fer as a sound collage with "a prominent place in most histories of electronic and computer music".

References

External links
 Étude aux chemins de fer at archive.org

1948 compositions
Compositions by Pierre Schaeffer
Musique concrète
Computer music compositions